Greg McAdam (born 18 February 1961) is a former Australian rules footballer who played with St Kilda in the AFL in 1985, and North Adelaide and Central District in the SANFL.

McAdam is an Indigenous Australian from Alice Springs. His younger brothers Adrian and Gilbert followed him into the AFL.

External links

1961 births
Living people
Australian rules footballers from the Northern Territory
St Kilda Football Club players
North Adelaide Football Club players
Indigenous Australian players of Australian rules football
South Australian State of Origin players